Matěj Kovář (born 17 May 2000) is a Czech professional footballer who plays as a goalkeeper for Sparta Prague, on loan from  club Manchester United.

Kovář joined the Manchester United youth system in 2018 from Czech club 1. FC Slovácko. He has spent time on loan at Swindon Town, where he made his senior debut, and Burton Albion. A Czech youth international, Kovář has represented his country from under-18 to under-21 level.

Club career
Kovář began his career with 1. FC Slovácko in his native Czech Republic, but moved to England to join Manchester United in January 2018 at the age of 17. After being an unused substitute for the under-19s in a 2017–18 UEFA Youth League match against rivals Liverpool on 21 February 2018, he made his debut for the club's under-18s side in a 4–1 league win at home to Everton three days later. He played in all but two of the team's remaining matches that season, replacing Alex Fojtíček as first-choice goalkeeper. Kovář was again the first-choice goalkeeper for the reserve team the following season, playing in 17 of their 22 league matches; he also played in six of the seven matches for the under-19s in the 2018–19 UEFA Youth League.

In 2019–20, he played in 11 of the 17 league matches the reserves played before the season was curtailed by the COVID-19 pandemic in the United Kingdom, as well as all four matches they played in the 2019–20 EFL Trophy, in which they came up against the senior sides of the teams in EFL League One and Two. His performances for the reserves earned him a new contract with the club, signed in October 2019. With the first team's qualification for the knockout phase of the 2019–20 UEFA Europa League secure, manager Ole Gunnar Solskjær selected a young team for their matchday 5 game against Astana in Kazakhstan on 28 November 2019; Kovář was named on the bench as back-up for Lee Grant, but did not play in the match.

Ahead of the 2020–21 season, Kovář moved on loan to Swindon Town in August 2020. He made his debut on 5 September 2020, in a 3–1 defeat against Charlton Athletic in the EFL Cup. In January 2021, Kovář was recalled by Manchester United after making 21 appearances for Swindon.

Kovář was named in United's final Premier League squad submitted after the end of the transfer deadline for the 2021–22 season. On 31 January 2022, Kovář signed a new contract with United until June 2023 and moved on loan to Burton Albion until the end of the season. On 9 September 2022, Kovář moved on loan to Czech club Sparta Prague. He made his debut on 10 September 2022, in a 2–2 away draw against FK Teplice in the Czech First League.

International career
Kovář has represented the Czech Republic at under-18, under-19, under-20 and under-21 youth levels. He was a member of the Czech squad at the 2021 UEFA European Under-21 Championship in March 2021, but did not make any appearances in the tournament. He made his debut for the under-21 team in September 2021 against Slovenia.

Kovář was first called up to the Czech Republic senior team on 8 September 2021 for a friendly against Ukraine after Tomáš Vaclík suffered an injury.

Career statistics

References

2000 births
Living people
People from Uherské Hradiště
Czech footballers
Czech Republic youth international footballers
Association football goalkeepers
1. FC Slovácko players
Manchester United F.C. players
Swindon Town F.C. players
Burton Albion F.C. players
English Football League players
Czech expatriate footballers
Expatriate footballers in England
Czech expatriate sportspeople in England
Czech Republic under-21 international footballers
Sportspeople from the Zlín Region
AC Sparta Prague players
Czech First League players